Professor Shlomo Shamai (Shitz) (Hebrew: שלמה שמאי (שיץ) ‏)  is a distinguished professor at the Department of Electrical engineering at the Technion − Israel Institute of Technology.  Professor Shamai is an information theorist and winner of the 2011 Shannon Award.

Shlomo Shamai (Shitz) received the B.Sc., M.Sc., and Ph.D. degrees in electrical engineering from the Technion, in 1975, 1981 and 1986 respectively.

During 1975-1985 he was with the Israeli Communications Research Labs. Since 1986 he is with the Department of Electrical Engineering at the Technion—Israel Institute of Technology, where he is now the William Fondiller Professor of Telecommunications.

His research areas cover a wide spectrum of topics in information theory and statistical communications.
 
Prof. Shamai is an IEEE Fellow and a member of the International Union of Radio Science (URSI).

Awards

 1999 van der Pol Gold Medal of URSI
 2000 co-recipient of the IEEE Donald G. Fink Prize Paper Award
 2003 Joint IT/COM Societies Paper Award
 2004 Joint IT/COM Societies Paper Award
 2007 Information Theory Society Paper Award
 2009 The European Commission FP7, Network of Excellence in Wireless COMmunications (NEWCOM++) Best Paper Award
 2010 Thomson Reuters Award for International Excellence in Scientific Research
 2011 Claude E. Shannon Award from the IEEE Information Theory Society
 2014 Rothschild Prize in Mathematics/Computer Sciences and Engineering
 2017 IEEE Richard W. Hamming Medal

He is also the recipient of the 1985 Alon Grant for distinguished young scientists and the 2000 Technion Henry Taub Prize for Excellence in Research. He has served as Associate Editor for the Shannon Theory of the IEEE Transactions on Information Theory, and has also served on the Board of Governors of the Information Theory Society.

In 2013, Shamai was elected a member of the National Academy of Engineering for contributions to information theory for wireless communication technology.

References

External links
 Shlomo Shamai's Webpage in the Technion Website
Shlomo Shamai's List of publications
Citation for Shannon Award

Living people
Fellow Members of the IEEE
Israeli information theorists
Academic staff of Technion – Israel Institute of Technology
Jewish scientists
Year of birth missing (living people)